Dawson Isla 10 is a 2009 Chilean drama film, written and directed by Miguel Littín, a Chilean film director. The screenplay is based on Isla 10, a book by Sergio Bitar about his experiences as a political prisoner; "Isla 10" was the substitute name their guards imposed him during his imprisonment.

Plot
The 1973 Chilean coup d'état led to the overthrow of President Salvador Allende and the rise to power of Augusto Pinochet in Chile. This film depicts the former members of Allende's cabinet, who were apprehended and confined in a political prison on Dawson Island, Tierra del Fuego, which had been transformed into a concentration camp. In the early 20th century, the camp was used to relocate Selk'nam and other indigenous groups from the main island, in order to put an end to their interference with the large sheep ranches that had been established, as they persisted in hunting in their former territories.

In 1973, Pinochet's government also imprisoned hundreds of other suspected communists and political dissidents on Dawson Island. Under the strict control of the Chilean Navy, these men struggled to survive the freezing temperatures and severe conditions.

Cast
 Benjamín Vicuña as Sergio Bitar
 Bertrand Duarte as Miguel Lawner 
 Pablo Krögh as José Tohá
 Cristián de la Fuente as Teniente Labarca 
 Sergio Hernández as Comandante Sallay 
 Luis Dubó as Sargento Figueroa 
 Caco Monteiro as Fernando Flores 
 Horacio Videla as Dr. Arturo Jiron
 Matías Vega as Osvaldo Puccio 
 Andrés Skoknik as Orlando Letelier
 Elvis Fuentes as Clodomiro Almeyda
 Sergio Allard as Aristóteles España

Submissions
The film was nominated for Best Spanish Language Foreign Film at the 24th edition of Goya Awards.

External links
 
 

2009 films
2000s Spanish-language films
2000s political drama films
Films about the Chilean military dictatorship
Films about politicians
Films directed by Miguel Littín
Films set in 1973
Films set in 1974
Chilean drama films
2009 drama films